The University of Michigan School of Education is the education school of the University of Michigan and is located in Ann Arbor, MI (the University of Michigan–Dearborn and the University of Michigan-Flint, while technically connected to the main Ann Arbor campus in small ways, operate completely separate education schools on their own campuses). The School of Education offers undergraduate, master's, and doctoral degrees. In 2011, U.S. News & World Report (USN&WR) ranked the school 9th overall. Within the school, specific programs ranked among USNWR's top-ten in six other areas: elementary education, secondary education, educational psychology (the Combined Program in Education and Psychology), higher education (the Center for the Study of Higher and Postsecondary Education), curriculum/instruction, and educational policy.

History 
The School of Education can be traced to the first charter of the University of Michigania, approved by the territorial government in 1817, which initially gave the university control over the state's entire system of public instruction. Although this arrangement was changed, the links between the university and the state's schools were firmly established.

In the spring of 1879, the Regents of the university created the Chair of the Science and Art of Teaching, the first full-time, permanent professorial chair in any American college or university devoted exclusively to the preparation of teachers. This regental act recognized the fact that many university students would become teachers and school administrators and that without instruction in education they would not be prepared for their work.

John Dewey spent the years 1884–1894 at the University of Michigan and while not directly involved in the education program he left his imprint on the university and was instrumental in launching the State of Michigan school accreditation program.

Education
Schools of education in Michigan
Educational institutions established in 1921
1921 establishments in Michigan
University of Michigan campus